Daxue may refer to:
Daxue (solar term) (大雪), 21st solar term in traditional East Asian calendars
Da Xue, or Great Learning (大學), one of the "Four Books" in Confucianism
Daxue Mountains (大雪山腰), mountain range in western Sichuan, China
Daxue Mountain (大雪山), in Shangri-La County, Yunnan, China
Daxue (town) (大峃镇), in Wencheng County, Zhejiang, China

See also
大學 (disambiguation)